KWTD (91.9 FM) is a non-commercial radio station that is licensed to Ridgecrest, California, United States and serves Ridgecrest, California City, and the Antelope Valley. The station is owned by Westside Christian Fellowship A.V. and broadcasts a Christian radio format consisting of Christian talk and teaching and contemporary Christian music, simulcasting KWTW in Bishop, California. KWTD transmits from El Paso Peak, south of Ridgecrest.

KWTD first signed on in May 2005.

References

External links

Antelope Valley
Mojave Desert
Ridgecrest, California
WTD